Thambikottai ( Younger Brother's Fort) is a 2011 Indian romantic action comedy film directed by R. Ammu Ramesh and produced by R. K. Suresh. It stars Narain, Meena, Poonam Bajwa and Sangeetha, with Prabhu, Santhanam, and Rajendran playing supporting roles. The music was composed by D. Imman with cinematography by Karnan. The film released on 11 February 2011. It received mixed reviews upon release.

Plot
Azhagiri is raised by his sister Shanmugapriya following their parents' early death. Azhagiri is a college student, while Priya is a lecturer. Azhagiri is closely bonded with his sister Priya. Azhagiri goes to a village named Thambikottai for a NSS field trip where he meets Kanaga, and both fall in love. Kanaga is the younger daughter of a local goon Amirthalingam. Kanaga’s elder sister Beeda Pandiamma is a rogue who creates ruckuses in the village often. Kanaga goes to Chennai for her studies but is kept under continuous monitoring by her sister’s henchmen as Pandiamma and Amirthalingam find out about Kanaga’s love affair. Azhagiri skillfully takes Kanaga away to his home. However, Kanaga is again taken away from Azhagiri’s home by Amirthalingam. Priya is surprised to see Amirthalingam. Priya tells a flashback whereby they actually belong to Thambikottai and their father Shanmugam was a bus driver working under Amirthalingam who owned a transport service with several buses. However, all the buses were poorly maintained, and Amirthalingam bribes the officials to obtain the fitness certificates. Despite several attempts made by Shanmugam to convince Amirthalingam to properly repair the buses, he neglects. This infuriates Shanmugam, and he resigns as does not want to risk the life of passengers. Lakshmi is Shanmugam's wife. When Lakshmi travels in Amirthalingam's bus, the brake fails and the bus meets with an accident, and Lakshmi passes away. Amirthalingam's bus company is sealed by the government. Angered, Amirthalingam bombs the bridge that connects Thambikottai with the land, and hence, no buses could enter the village unless the bridge is repaired. Shanmugam is also killed by Amirthalingam's men. Now, Azhagiri fights against Pandiamma's henchmen and rescues Kanaga. In the fight, Pandiamma is accidentally killed by one of her henchmen. Azhagiri also fights against Amirthalingam and helps reconstruct the broken bridge in Thambikottai.

Cast

 Narain as Azhagiri Shanmugam
 Meena as Shanmugapriya, Azhagiri's sister
 Poonam Bajwa as Kanaga Amirthalingam, Azhagiri's love interest (Voice Dubbed By Renuka Kathir)
 Sangeetha as Beeda Pandiamma, Amirthalingam's elder daughter (Voice Dubbed By Jeyegeetha) 
 Prabhu as Shanmugam, Azhagiri and Shanmugapriya's father
 Santhanam as Saissa, Azhagiri's friend
 Rajendran as Amirthalingam, Kanaga's father
 Vijayalakshmi as Lakshmi
 M. S. Bhaskar as Valayapatti, Azhagiri's professor
 Meera Krishnan as Kanaga's mother
 Ganja Karuppu as Karuppu
 Sriranjini as Sridevi, the college principal
 Manobala as Puli
 Karate Raja as Amirthalingam's son-in-law
 Jasper as Amirthalingam's assistant
 Riyaz Khan as Goon
 Aarthi
 Ramdoss as Pandiamma's henchman (uncredited)

Production
The film was launched at AVM Studios on 14 December 2009. Prabhu, Mysskin, Jayam Ravi, Mohan Raja, Kalaipuli S. Thanu, and Prasana were present for the function.

Music
The soundtrack was composed by D. Imman. All lyrics written by Viveka.

References

External links
 

2011 films
2010s masala films
2010s Tamil-language films